Justin Hocking may refer to:

 Justin Hocking (ice hockey) (born 1974), Canadian ice hockey defenceman
 Justin Hocking (writer) (born 1973), American essayist and writer